Satyajit Ray  (2 May 1921 – 23 April 1992) was an Indian director, screenwriter, documentary filmmaker, author, essayist, lyricist, magazine editor, illustrator, calligrapher, and music composer. Considered one of the greatest auteurs of film-making, Ray is celebrated for works including The Apu Trilogy (1955–1959), The Music Room (1958), The Big City (1963) and Charulata (1964) and the Goopy–Bagha trilogy.

Ray was born in Calcutta to nonsense rhyme author Sukumar Ray. Starting his career as a commercial artist, Ray was drawn into independent film-making after meeting French filmmaker Jean Renoir and viewing Vittorio De Sica's Italian neorealist film Bicycle Thieves (1948) during a visit to London.

Ray directed 36 films, including feature films, documentaries, and shorts. Ray's first film, Pather Panchali (1955) won eleven international prizes, including the inaugural Best Human Document award at the 1956 Cannes Film Festival. This film, along with Aparajito (1956) and Apur Sansar (The World of Apu) (1959), form The Apu Trilogy. Ray did the scripting, casting, scoring, and editing, and designed his own credit titles and publicity material. He also authored several short stories and novels, primarily for young children and teenagers. Popular characters created by Ray include Feluda the sleuth, Professor Shonku the scientist, Tarini Khuro the storyteller, and Lalmohan Ganguly the novelist.

Ray received many major awards in his career, including thirty-six Indian National Film Awards, a Golden Lion, a Golden Bear, two Silver Bears, many additional awards at international film festivals and ceremonies, and an Academy Honorary Award in 1992. In 1978, he was awarded an honorary degree by Oxford University. The Government of India honored him with the Bharat Ratna, its highest civilian award, in 1992. 

On the occasion of the birth centenary of Ray, the International Film Festival of India in recognition of the auteur’s legacy, rechristened in 2021 its annual Lifetime Achievement award to "Satyajit Ray Lifetime Achievement Award".

Background

Lineage 
Satyajit Ray's ancestry can be traced back for at least ten generations. His family had acquired the name 'Ray' (originally 'Rai') from the Mughals. Although they were Bengali Kayasthas, the Rays were 'Vaishnavas' (worshippers of Vishnu), as opposed to the majority of Bengali Kayasthas who were 'Shaktos' (worshippers of the Shakti or Shiva).

The earliest-recorded ancestor of Ray family was Ramsunder Deo (Deb), born in the middle of the sixteenth century. He was a native of Chakdah village in Nadia district of present-day West Bengal, India and migrated to Sherpur in East Bengal. He became son-in-law of the ruler of Jashodal and was granted a jagir (a feudal land grant) at Jashodal (in present day Kishoreganj District of Bangladesh). His descendants migrated to the village Masua in Katiadi Upazila of Kishoreganj district in the first half of eighteenth century. Satyajit Ray's grandfather Upendrakishore Ray was born in Masua village in 1863. 

Upendrakishore Ray was a writer, illustrator, philosopher, publisher, amateur astronomer, and a leader of the Brahmo Samaj, a religious and social movement in 19th-century Bengal. He set up a printing press named U. Ray and Sons.

Sukumar Ray, Upendrakishore's son and father of Satyajit, was an illustrator, critic, and a pioneering Bengali writer of nonsense rhyme (Abol Tabol) and children's literature. Social worker and children's book author Shukhalata Rao was his aunt.

Early life and education

Satyajit Ray was born to Sukumar Ray and Suprabha Ray (nee Das Gupta) in Calcutta (now Kolkata). Sukumar Ray died when Satyajit was two years old. Ray grew up in the house in which his grandfather, Upendrakishore Ray Chowdhury's printing press was located. He was attracted by the machines and process of printing from an early age, and took particular interest in the production process of Sandesh, a children's magazine started by Upendrakishore Ray Chowdhury.  Ray studied at Ballygunge Government High School in Calcutta, and completed his BA in economics at Presidency College, Calcutta (then affiliated with the University of Calcutta). During his school days, he saw several Hollywood productions in cinema. The works of Charlie Chaplin, Buster Keaton, Harold Lloyd, Ernst Lubitsch and movies such as The Thief of Baghdad and  Uncle Tom's Cabin made lasting impression on his mind. He developed keen interest in Western classical music.

In 1940, his mother insisted him to study at Visva-Bharati University in Santiniketan, founded by Rabindranath Tagore. Ray was reluctant to go, due to his fondness for Calcutta and the low regard for the intellectual life at Santiniketan. His mother's persuasiveness and his respect for Tagore finally convinced him to get admitted there for higher studies in Fine Art. In Santiniketan, Ray came to appreciate Oriental art. He later admitted that he learned much from the famous painters Nandalal Bose and Benode Behari Mukherjee. He later produced a documentary, The Inner Eye, about Mukherjee. His visits to Ajanta, Ellora and Elephanta stimulated his admiration for Indian art. Three books that he read in the university influenced him to become a serious student of film-making: Paul Rotha's The Film Till Now, and two books on theory by Rudolf Arnheim and Raymond Spottiswoode. Ray dropped out of the art course in 1942 as he could not feel inspired to become a painter.

Visual artist
In 1943, Ray started working at D.J. Keymer, a British advertising agency, as a junior visualiser. Here he was trained the Indian commercial art under  artist  Annada Munshi, the then Art Director of D.J. Keymer. Although he liked visual design (graphic design) and he was mostly treated well, there was tension between the British and Indian employees of the firm. The British were better paid, and Ray felt that "the clients were generally stupid." In 1943, Ray started a second job for the Signet Press, a new publisher started by D. K. Gupta. Gupta asked Ray to create book cover designs for the company and gave him complete artistic freedom. Ray established himself as a commercial illustrator, becoming a leading Indian typographer and book-jacket designer. 

Ray designed covers for many books, including Jibanananda Das's Banalata Sen and Rupasi Bangla, Bibhutibhushan Bandyopadhyay's Chander Pahar, Jim Corbett's Maneaters of Kumaon, and Jawaharlal Nehru's Discovery of India. He worked on a children's version of Pather Panchali, a classic Bengali novel by Bibhutibhushan Bandyopadhyay, renamed Aam Antir Bhepu (The mango-seed whistle). Ray designed the cover and illustrated the book, and was deeply influenced by the work. He used it as the subject of his first film and featured his illustrations as shots in his ground-breaking film. 

Ray befriended the American soldiers stationed in Calcutta during World War II, who kept him informed about the latest American films showing in the city. He came to know a RAF employee, Norman Clare, who shared Ray's passion for films, chess and western classical music. Ray was a regular in the addas (freestyle casual conversations)  at Coffee House where several intellectuals frequented. He formed lasting association with some of the compatriots, such as Bansi Chandragupta (who late became a celebrated art director), Kamal Kumar Majumdar (a polymath and author of stylish prose),  Radha Prasad Gupta, Chidananda Das Gupta (film critic). Along with Chidananda Dasgupta and others, Ray founded the Calcutta Film Society in 1947. They screened many foreign films, many of which Ray watched and seriously studied, including several American and Russian films. The use of Indian music and dancing in the 1948 Indian film Kalpana, directed by the celebrated dancer Uday Shankar, had impact on Ray. 

In 1949, Ray married Bijoya Das, his first cousin and long-time sweetheart. The couple had a son, Sandip Ray, a film director. In the same year, French director Jean Renoir came to Calcutta to shoot his film The River. Ray helped him to find locations in the countryside. Ray told Renoir about his idea of filming Pather Panchali, which had long been on his mind, and Renoir encouraged him in the project.

In 1950, D.J. Keymer sent Ray to London to work at the headquarters. During his six months in London, Ray watched 99 films, including Alexander Dovzhenko's Earth (1930) and Jean Renoir's The Rules of the Game (1939). However, the film that had the most profound effect on him was the neorealist film Ladri di biciclette (Bicycle Thieves) (1948) by Vittorio De Sica. Ray later said that he walked out of the theatre determined to become a filmmaker.

Film career

The Apu years (1950–1959)

After being "deeply moved" by Pather Panchali, the 1928 classic Bildungsroman of Bengali literature, Ray decided to adapt it for his first film. Pather Panchali is a semi-autobiographical novel describing the maturation of Apu, a small boy in a Bengal village. Pather Panchali did not have a script; it was made from Ray's drawings and notes. Before principal photography began, he created a storyboard dealing with details and continuity. Years later, he donated those drawings and notes to Cinémathèque Française.

Ray gathered an inexperienced crew, although both his cameraman Subrata Mitra and art director Bansi Chandragupta would go on to achieve great acclaim. The cast consisted of mostly amateur actors. After unsuccessful attempts to persuade many producers to finance the project, Ray started shooting in late 1952 with his personal savings and hoped to raise more money once he had some footage shot, but did not succeed on his terms. As a result, Ray shot Pather Panchali over two and a half years, an unusually long period. He refused funding from sources who wanted to change the script or exercise supervision over production. He also ignored advice from the Indian government to incorporate a happy ending, but he did receive funding that allowed him to complete the film.

Monroe Wheeler, head of the department of exhibitions and publications at New York's Museum of Modern Art (MoMA), heard about the project when he visited Calcutta in 1954. He considered the incomplete footage to be of high quality and encouraged Ray to finish the film so that it could be shown at a MoMA exhibition the following year. Six months later, American director John Huston, on a visit to India for some early location scouting for The Man Who Would Be King, saw excerpts of the unfinished film and recognised "the work of a great film-maker". 

With a loan from the West Bengal government, Ray finally completed the film; it was released in 1955 to critical acclaim. It earned numerous awards and had long theatrical runs in India and abroad. The Times of India wrote "It is absurd to compare it with any other Indian cinema [...] Pather Panchali is pure cinema." In the United Kingdom, Lindsay Anderson wrote a positive review of the film. However, the film also gained negative reactions; François Truffaut was reported to have said, "I don't want to see a movie of peasants eating with their hands." Bosley Crowther, then the most influential critic of The New York Times, criticised the film's loose structure and conceded that it "takes patience to be enjoyed". Edward Harrison, an American distributor was worried that Crowther's review would dissuade audiences, but the film enjoyed an eight months theatrical run in the United States.

Ray's international career started in earnest after the success of his next film, the second in The Apu Trilogy, Aparajito (1956) (The Unvanquished). This film depicts the eternal struggle between the ambitions of a young man, Apu, and the mother who loves him. Upon release, Aparajito won the Golden Lion at the Venice Film Festival, bringing Ray considerable acclaim. In a retrospective review, Edward Guthmann of the San Francisco Chronicle praised Ray for his ability to capture emotions, and blend music with storytelling to create a "flawless" picture. Critics such as Mrinal Sen and Ritwik Ghatak rank it higher than Ray's first film.

Ray directed and released two other films in 1958: the comic Parash Pathar (The Philosopher's Stone), and Jalsaghar (The Music Room), a film about the decadence of the Zamindars, considered one of his most important works. Timeout magazine gave Jalsaghar a positive review, describing it as "slow, rapt and hypnotic".

While making Aparajito, Ray had not planned a trilogy, but after he was asked about the idea in Venice, it appealed to him. He finished the last of the trilogy, Apur Sansar (The World of Apu) in 1959. Ray introduced two of his favourite actors, Soumitra Chatterjee and Sharmila Tagore, in this film. It opens with Apu living in a Calcutta house in near-poverty; he becomes involved in an unusual marriage with Aparna. The scenes of their life together form "one of the cinema's classic affirmative depictions of married life." Critics Robin Wood and Aparna Sen thought it was a major achievement to mark the end of the trilogy.

After Apur Sansar was harshly criticised by a Bengali critic, Ray wrote an article defending it. He rarely responded to critics during his filmmaking career, but also later defended his film Charulata, his personal favourite. Critic Roger Ebert summarised the trilogy as "It is about a time, place and culture far removed from our own, and yet it connects directly and deeply with our human feelings. It is like a prayer, affirming that this is what the cinema can be, no matter how far in our cynicism we may stray."

Despite Ray's success, it had little influence on his personal life in the years to come. He continued to live with his wife and children in a rented house, with his mother, uncle and other members of his extended family.

From Devi to Charulata (1959–1964)
During this period, Ray made films about the British Raj period, a documentary on Tagore, a comic film (Mahapurush) and his first film from an original screenplay ('Kanchenjungha'). He also made a series of films that, taken together, are considered by critics among the most deeply felt portrayals of Indian women on screen.

Ray followed Apur Sansar with 1960's Devi (The Goddess), a film in which he examined the superstitions in Hindu society. Sharmila Tagore starred as Doyamoyee, a young wife who is deified by her father-in-law. Ray was worried that the Central Board of Film Certification might block his film, or at least make him re-cut it, but Devi was spared. Upon international distribution, the critic from Chicago Reader described the film as "full of sensuality and ironic undertones".

In 1961, on the insistence of Prime Minister Jawaharlal Nehru, Ray was commissioned to make Rabindranath Tagore, based on the poet of the same name, on the occasion of his birth centennial, a tribute to the person who likely most influenced Ray. Due to limited footage of Tagore, Ray was challenged by the necessity of making the film mainly with static material. He said that it took as much work as three feature films.

In the same year, together with Subhas Mukhopadhyay and others, Ray was able to revive Sandesh, the children's magazine which his grandfather had founded. Ray had been saving money for some years to make this possible. A duality in the name (Sandesh means both "news" in Bengali and also a sweet popular dessert) set the tone of the magazine (both educational and entertaining). Ray began to make illustrations for it, as well as to write stories and essays for children. Writing eventually became a steady source of income.

In 1962, Ray directed Kanchenjungha, Based on his first original screenplay, it was also his first colour film. It tells the story of an upper-class family spending an afternoon in Darjeeling, a picturesque hill town in West Bengal. They try to arrange the engagement of their youngest daughter to a highly paid engineer educated in London.

Ray had first conceived shooting the film in a large mansion, but later decided to film it in the famous town. He used many shades of light and mist to reflect the tension in the drama. Ray noted that while his script allowed shooting to be possible under any lighting conditions, a commercial film crew in Darjeeling failed to shoot a single scene, as they only wanted to do so in sunshine. The New York Times Bosley Crowther gave the film a mixed review; he praised Ray's "soft and relaxed" filmmaking but thought the characters were clichés.

In 1964, Ray directed Charulata (The Lonely Wife). One of Ray's favourite films, it was regarded by many critics as his most accomplished. Based on Tagore's short story, Nastanirh (Broken Nest), the film tells of a lonely wife, Charu, in 19th-century Bengal, and her growing feelings for her brother-in-law Amal. In retrospective reviews, The Guardian called it "extraordinarily vivid and fresh", while The Sydney Morning Herald praised Madhabi Mukherjee's casting, the film's visual style, and its camera movements. Ray said the film contained the fewest flaws among his work and it was his only work which, given a chance, he would make exactly the same way. At the 15th Berlin International Film Festival, Charulata earned him a Silver Bear for Best Director. Other films in this period include Mahanagar (The Big City), Teen Kanya (Three Daughters), Abhijan (The Expedition), Kapurush (The Coward) and Mahapurush (Holy Man). The first of these, Mahanagar drew praise from British critics; Philip French opined that it was one of Ray's best.

Also in the 1960s, Ray visited Japan and took pleasure in meeting filmmaker Akira Kurosawa, whom he highly regarded.

New directions (1965–1982)
In the post-Charulata period, Ray took on various projects, from fantasy, science fiction, and detective stories to historical dramas. Ray also experimented during this period, exploring contemporary issues of Indian life in response to the perceived lack of these issues in his films.

The first major film in this period is 1966's Nayak (The Hero), the story of a screen hero travelling in a train and meeting a young, sympathetic female journalist. Starring Uttam Kumar and Sharmila Tagore, in the twenty-four hours of the journey, the film explores the inner conflict of the apparently highly successful matinée idol. Although the film received a "Critics Prize" at the Berlin International Film Festival, it had a generally muted reception.

In 1967, Ray wrote a script for a film to be called The Alien, based on his short story "Bankubabur Bandhu" ("Banku Babu's Friend"), which he wrote in 1962 for Sandesh magazine. It was planned to be a U.S. and India co-production with Columbia Pictures, with Marlon Brando and Peter Sellers cast in the leading roles. Ray found that his script had been copyrighted and the fee appropriated by Michael Wilson. Wilson had initially approached Ray through their mutual friend, Arthur C. Clarke, to represent him in Hollywood. Wilson copyrighted the script credited to Mike Wilson & Satyajit Ray, although he contributed only one word. Ray later said that he never received compensation for the script. After Brando dropped out of the project, the producers tried to replace him with James Coburn, but Ray became disillusioned and returned to Calcutta. Columbia attempted to revive the project, without success, in the 1970s and 1980s. 

In 1969, Ray directed one of his most commercially successful films; a musical fantasy based on a children's story written by his grandfather, Goopy Gyne Bagha Byne (The Adventures of Goopy and Bagha). It is about the journey of Goopy the singer, and Bagha the drummer, endowed with three gifts by the King of Ghosts, to stop an impending war between two neighbouring kingdoms. One of his most expensive projects, the film was also difficult to finance. Ray abandoned his desire to shoot it in colour, as he turned down an offer that would have forced him to cast a certain Hindi film actor as the lead. He also composed the songs and music for the film.

Next, Ray directed the film adaptation of a novel by the poet and writer, Sunil Gangopadhyay. Featuring a musical motif structure acclaimed as more complex than Charulata, Aranyer Din Ratri (1970) (Days and Nights in the Forest) follows four urban young men going to the forests for a vacation. They try to leave their daily lives behind, but one of them encounters women, and it becomes a deep study of the Indian middle class. First shown at the New York Film Festival in 1970, critic Pauline Kael wrote "Satyajit Ray’s films can give rise to a more complex feeling of happiness in me than the work of any other director [...] No artist has done more than Ray to make us reevaluate the commonplace". Writing for the BBC in 2002, Jamie Russell complimented the script, pacing and mixture of emotions. According to one critic, Robin Wood, "a single sequence [of the film] ... would offer material for a short essay".

After Aranyer Din Ratri, Ray addressed contemporary Bengali life. He completed what became known as the Calcutta trilogy: Pratidwandi (1970), Seemabaddha (1971), and Jana Aranya (1975), three films that were conceived separately but had similar themes. The trilogy focuses on repression, with male protagonists encountering the forbidden. Pratidwandi (The Adversary) is about an idealist young graduate; while disillusioned by the end of film, he is still uncorrupted. Seemabaddha (Company Limited) portrayed a successful man giving up his morality for further gains. Jana Aranya (The Middleman) depicted a young man giving in to the culture of corruption to earn a living. In the first film, Pratidwandi, Ray introduces new narrative techniques, such as scenes in negative, dream sequences, and abrupt flashbacks.

Also in the 1970s, Ray adapted two of his popular stories as detective films. Although mainly aimed at children and young adults, both Sonar Kella (The Golden Fortress) and Joi Baba Felunath (The Elephant God) became cult favorites. In a 2019 review of Sonar Kella, critic Rouven Linnarz was impressed with its use of Indian classical instruments to generate "mysterious progression".

Ray considered making a film on the 1971 Bangladesh Liberation War but later abandoned the idea, saying that, as a filmmaker, he was more interested in the travails of the refugees and not the politics. In 1977, Ray completed Shatranj Ke Khilari (The Chess Players), a Hindustani film based on a short story by Munshi Premchand. It was set in Lucknow in the state of Oudh, a year before the Indian Rebellion of 1857. A commentary on issues related to the colonisation of India by the British, it was Ray's first feature film in a language other than Bengali. It starred a high-profile cast including Sanjeev Kumar, Saeed Jaffrey, Amjad Khan, Shabana Azmi, Victor Bannerjee and Richard Attenborough. Despite the film's limited budget, The Washington Post critic gave it a positive review; "He [Ray] possesses what many overindulged Hollywood filmmakers often lack: a view of history".

In 1980, Ray made a sequel to Goopy Gyne Bagha Byne, a somewhat political Hirak Rajar Deshe (Kingdom of Diamonds). The kingdom of the evil Diamond King, or Hirok Raj, is an allusion to India during Indira Gandhi's emergency period. Along with his acclaimed short film Pikoo (Pikoo's Diary) and hour-long Hindi film, Sadgati, this was the culmination of his work in this period.

When E.T. was released in 1982, Clarke and Ray saw similarities in the film to his earlier The Alien script; Ray claimed that E.T. plagiarised his script. Ray said that Steven Spielberg's film "would not have been possible without my script of The Alien' being available throughout America in mimeographed copies." Spielberg denied any plagiarism by saying, "I was a kid in high school when this script was circulating in Hollywood." (Spielberg actually graduated high school in 1965 and released his first film in 1968). Besides The Alien, two other unrealised projects that Ray had intended to direct were adaptations of the ancient Indian epic, the Mahābhārata, and E. M. Forster's 1924 novel A Passage to India.

Final years (1983–1992)

In 1983, while working on Ghare Baire (Home and the World), Ray suffered a heart attack; it would severely limit his productivity in the remaining nine years of his life. Ghare Baire, an adaptation of the novel of the same name, was completed in 1984 with the help of Ray's son, who served as a camera operator from then onward. It is about the dangers of fervent nationalism; he wrote the first draft of a script for it in the 1940s. Despite rough patches due to Ray's illness, the film did receive some acclaim; critic Vincent Canby gave the film a maximum rating of five stars and praised the performances of the three lead actors. It also featured the first kiss scene portrayed in Ray's films.

In 1987, Ray recovered to an extent to direct the 1990 film Shakha Proshakha (Branches of the Tree). It depicts an old man, who has lived a life of honesty, and learns of the corruption of three of his sons. The final scene shows the father finding solace only in the companionship of his fourth son, who is uncorrupted but mentally ill due to a head injury sustained while he was studying in England.

Ray's last film, Agantuk (The Stranger), is lighter in mood but not in theme; when a long-lost uncle arrives to visit his niece in Calcutta, he arouses suspicion as to his motive. It provokes far-ranging questions in the film about civilisation. Critic Hal Hinson was impressed, and thought Agantuk shows "all the virtues of a master artist in full maturity".

A heavy smoker but non-drinker, Ray valued work more than anything else. He would work 12 hours a day, and go to bed at two o'clock in the morning. He also enjoyed collecting antiques, manuscripts, rare gramophone records, paintings and rare books.

In 1992, Ray's health deteriorated due to heart complications. He was admitted to a hospital but never recovered. Twenty-four days before his death, Ray was presented with an Honorary Academy Award by Audrey Hepburn via video-link; he was in gravely ill condition, but gave an acceptance speech, calling it the "best achievement of [his] movie-making career." He died on 23 April 1992, 9 days before his 71st birthday.

Literary works

Ray created two popular fictional characters in Bengali children's literature— Pradosh Chandra Mitter (Mitra) alias Feluda, a sleuth, and Professor Shonku, a scientist. The Feluda stories are narrated by Tapesh Ranjan Mitra aka Topshe, his teenage cousin, something of a Watson to Feluda's Holmes. The science fiction stories of Shonku are presented as a diary discovered after the scientist had mysteriously disappeared.

Ray also wrote a collection of nonsense verse named Today Bandha Ghorar Dim, which includes a translation of Lewis Carroll's "Jabberwocky". He wrote a collection of humorous stories of Mullah Nasiruddin in Bengali.

His short stories were published as collections of 12 stories, in which the overall title played with the word twelve (for example Aker pitthe dui, or literally "Two on top of one"). Ray's interest in puzzles and puns is reflected in his stories. Ray's short stories give full rein to his interest in the macabre, in suspense and other aspects that he avoided in film, making for an interesting psychological study. Most of his writings have been translated into English. Most of his screenplays have been published in Bengali in the literary journal Eksan. Ray wrote an autobiography about his childhood years, Jakhan Choto Chilam (1982), translated to English as Childhood Days: A Memoir by his wife Bijoya Ray. In 1994, Ray published his memoir, My Years with Apu, about his experiences of making The Apu Trilogy.

He also wrote essays on film, published as the collections: Our Films, Their Films (1976), Bishoy Chalachchitra (1976), and Ekei Bole Shooting (1979). During the mid-1990s, Ray's film essays and an anthology of short stories were also published in English in the West. Our Films, Their Films is an anthology of film criticism by Ray. The book contains articles and personal journal excerpts. The book is presented in two sections: Ray first discusses Indian film, before turning his attention toward Hollywood, specific filmmakers (Charlie Chaplin and Akira Kurosawa), and movements such as Italian neorealism. His book Bishoy Chalachchitra was published in translation in 2006 as Speaking of Films. It contains a compact description of his philosophy of different aspects of the cinemas.

Calligraphy and design
Ray designed four typefaces for roman script named Ray Roman, Ray Bizarre, Daphnis, and Holiday script, apart from numerous Bengali ones for the Sandesh magazine. Ray Roman and Ray Bizarre won an international competition in 1971.

In certain circles of Calcutta, Ray continued to be known as an eminent graphic designer, well into his film career. Ray illustrated all his books and designed covers for them, as well as creating all publicity material for his films, for example, Ray's artistic playing with the Bengali graphemes was also revealed in the cine posters and cine promo-brochures' covers. He also designed covers of several books by other authors. His calligraphic technique reflects the deep impact of (a) the artistic pattern of European musical staff notation in the graphemic syntagms and (b) alpana ("ritual painting" mainly practised by Bengali women at the time of religious festivals (the term denotes 'to coat with'). Generally categorised as "Folk"-Art cf. in Ray's graphemes representations.

Thus, so-called division between classical and folk art is blurred in Ray's representation of Bengali graphemes. The three-tier X-height of Bengali graphemes was presented in a manner of musical map and the contours, curves in between horizontal and vertical meeting-point, follow the patterns of alpana. It is also noticed that the metamorphosis of graphemes (this might be designated as "Archewriting") as a living object/subject in Ray's positive manipulation of Bengali graphemes.

As a graphic designer, Ray designed most of his film posters, combining folk art and calligraphy to create themes ranging from mysterious, surreal to comical; an exhibition for his posters was held at British Film Institute in 2013. He would master every style of visual art, and could mimic any painter, as evidenced in his book and magazine covers, posters, literary illustrations and advertisement campaigns.

Filmmaking style and influences

Ray had been subconsciously paying a tribute to Jean Renoir throughout his career, who influenced him the most. He also acknowledged Vittorio De Sica, whom he thought represented Italian Neorealism best, and taught him the cramming of cinematic details into a single shot, and using amateur actors and actresses. Ray has admitted to have learnt the craft of cinema from Old Hollywood directors such as John Ford, Billy Wilder and Ernst Lubitsch. He had deep respect and admiration for his contemporaries Akira Kurosawa and Ingmar Bergman, whom he considered giants. Among others, he learnt the use of freeze frame shots from François Truffaut, and jump cuts, fades and dissolves from Jean-Luc Godard. Although he admired Godard's "revolutionary" early phase, he thought his later phase was "alien". Ray adored his peer Michelangelo Antonioni, but hated Blowup, which he considered having "very little inner movement". He was also impressed with Stanley Kubrick's work. Although Ray stated to have had very little influence from Sergei Eisenstein, films such as Pather Panchali, Aparajito, Charulata and Sadgati contains scenes which show striking uses of montage. He also had sketches of Eisenstein.

Ray considered script-writing to be an integral part of direction. Initially he refused to make a film in any language other than Bengali. In his two non-Bengali feature films, he wrote the script in English; translators adapted it into Hindustani under Ray's supervision.

Ray's eye for detail was matched by that of his art director Bansi Chandragupta. His influence on the early films was so important that Ray would always write scripts in English before creating a Bengali version, so that the non-Bengali Chandragupta would be able to read it. Subrata Mitra's cinematography garnered praise in Ray's films, although some critics thought that Mitra's eventual departure from Ray lowered its quality. Mitra stopped working for him after Nayak. Mitra developed "bounce lighting", a technique to reflect light from cloth to create a diffused, realistic light even on a set.

Ray's regular film editor was Dulal Datta, but the director usually dictated the editing while Datta did the actual work. Due to finances and Ray's meticulous planning, his films (apart from Pather Panchali) were mostly cut in-camera.

At the beginning of his career, Ray worked with Indian classical musicians, including Ravi Shankar, Vilayat Khan, and Ali Akbar Khan. He found that their first loyalty was to musical traditions, and not to his film. He obtained a greater understanding of Western classical forms, which he wanted to use for his films set in an urban milieu. Starting with Teen Kanya, Ray began to compose his own scores. Beethoven was Ray's favourite composer; Ray also went on to become a distinguished connoisseur of Western classical music in India. The narrative structure of Ray's films are represented by musical forms such as sonata, fugue and rondo. Kanchenjunga, Nayak and Aranyer Din Ratri are examples of this structure.

The director cast actors from diverse backgrounds, from well-known stars to people who had never seen a film (as in Aparajito). Robin Wood and others have lauded him as the best director of children, recalling memorable performances in the roles of Apu and Durga (Pather Panchali), Ratan (Postmaster) and Mukul (Sonar Kella). Depending on the actor's skill and experience, Ray varied the intensity of his direction, from virtually nothing with actors such as Utpal Dutt, to using the actor as a puppet (Subir Banerjee as young Apu or Sharmila Tagore as Aparna).

Actors who had worked for Ray trusted him, but said that he could also treat incompetence with total contempt. With admiration of his cinematic style and craft, director Roger Manvell said, “In the restrained style he has adopted, Ray has become a master of technique. He takes his timing from the nature of the people and their environment; his camera is the intent, unobtrusive observer of reactions; his editing the discreet, economical transition from one value to the next." Ray credited life to be the best kind of inspiration for cinema; he said, "For a popular medium, the best kind of inspiration should derive from life and have its roots in it. No amount of technical polish can make up for artificiality of the theme and the dishonesty of treatment."

Critical and popular responses
Ray's work has been described as full of humanism and universality, and of a deceptive simplicity with deep underlying complexity. The Japanese director Akira Kurosawa said, "Not to have seen the cinema of Ray means existing in the world without seeing the sun or the moon." But his detractors find his films glacially slow, moving like a "majestic snail." Some critics find his work anti-modern; they criticise him for lacking the new modes of expression or experimentation found in works of Ray's contemporaries, such as Jean-Luc Godard. As Stanley Kauffmann wrote, some critics believe that Ray assumes that viewers "can be interested in a film that simply dwells in its characters, rather than one that imposes dramatic patterns on their lives." Ray said he could do nothing about the slow pace. Kurosawa defended him by saying that Ray's films were not slow; "His work can be described as flowing composedly, like a big river".

Critics have often compared Ray to Anton Chekhov, Jean Renoir, Vittorio De Sica, Howard Hawks and Mozart. The writer V. S. Naipaul compared a scene in Shatranj Ki Khiladi (The Chess Players) to a Shakespearean play; he wrote, "only three hundred words are spoken but goodness! – terrific things happen." Even critics who did not like the aesthetics of Ray's films generally acknowledged his ability to encompass a whole culture with all its nuances. Ray's obituary in The Independent included the question, "Who else can compete?"

His work was promoted in France by The Studio des Ursuline cinema. French photographer Henri Cartier-Bresson described Ray as “undoubtedly a giant in the film world”. With positive admiration for most of Ray's films, critic Roger Ebert cited The Apu Trilogy among the greatest films. Vincent Canby once wrote about Ray's films "no matter what the particular story, no matter what the social-political circumstances of the characters, the cinema of Satyajit Ray (the Apu trilogy, The Music Room, Distant Thunder and The Chess Players, among others) is so exquisitely realized that an entire world is evoked from comparatively limited details."

Praising his contribution to the world of cinema, Martin Scorsese said: "His work is in the company of that of living contemporaries like Ingmar Bergman, Akira Kurosawa and Federico Fellini." Francis Ford Coppola cited Ray as a major influence; he praised 1960's Devi,  which Coppola considers as his best work and a "cinematic milestone"; Coppola admits to learning Indian cinema through Ray's works. On a trip to India, Christopher Nolan expressed his admiration for Ray's Pather Panchali. Nolan said, "I have had the pleasure of watching [Satyajit Ray's] Pather Panchali recently, which I hadn't seen before. I think it is one of the best films ever made. It is an extraordinary piece of work."

Politics and ego have also influenced debate regarding Ray's work. Certain advocates of socialism claim that Ray was not "committed" to the cause of the nation's downtrodden classes while some critics accused him of glorifying poverty in Pather Panchali and Ashani Sanket (Distant Thunder) through lyricism and aesthetics. They said he provided no solution to conflicts in the stories, and was unable to overcome his bourgeois background. During the naxalite movements in the 1970s, agitators once came close to causing physical harm to his son, Sandip.

In early 1980, Ray was criticised by an Indian M.P., and former actress Nargis Dutt, who accused Ray of "exporting poverty". She wanted him to make films that represent "Modern India". In a highly public exchange of letters during the 1960s, Ray harshly criticized the film Akash Kusum by colleague Mrinal Sen. Ray said that Sen only attacked "easy targets", for example the Bengali middle classes. That Akash Kusum bore some resemblance to Parash Pathar, a film Sen had admitted to not liking, may have played a role in fracturing their previously cordial relationship. Ray would continue to make films on this "easy target" demographic, including Pratidwandi and Jana Aranya (set during the naxalite movement in Bengal), and the two filmmakers would continue to trade praise and criticism the rest of their careers.

Legacy

Ray is a cultural icon in India and in Bengali communities worldwide. Following his death, the city of Calcutta came to a virtual standstill, as hundreds of thousands of people gathered around his house to pay their last respects. Ray's influence has been widespread and deep in Bengali cinema; many Bengali directors, including Aparna Sen, Rituparno Ghosh and Gautam Ghose as well as Vishal Bhardwaj, Dibakar Banerjee, Shyam Benegal and Sujoy Ghosh from Hindi cinema in India, Tareq Masud and Tanvir Mokammel in Bangladesh, and Aneel Ahmad in England, have been influenced by his craft. Across the spectrum, filmmakers such as Budhdhadeb Dasgupta, Mrinal Sen and Adoor Gopalakrishnan have acknowledged his seminal contribution to Indian cinema. Beyond India, filmmakers Martin Scorsese, Francis Ford Coppola, George Lucas, James Ivory, Abbas Kiarostami, Elia Kazan, William Wyler, François Truffaut, John Huston, Carlos Saura, Isao Takahata, Oliver Stone Quentin Tarantino, Wes Anderson, Danny Boyle Christopher Nolan, and many other international filmmakers have been influenced by Ray's cinematic style.

Gregory Nava's 1995 film My Family had a final scene that was reminiscent of Apur Sansar. Ira Sachs's 2005 work Forty Shades of Blue was a loose remake of Charulata. Other references to Ray's films are found, for example, in 2006's Sacred Evil, and the Elements trilogy by Deepa Mehta. According to Michael Sragow of The Atlantic Monthly, the "youthful coming-of-age dramas that have flooded art houses since the mid-fifties owe a tremendous debt to The Apu Trilogy". Kanchenjungha introduced a narrative structure that resembles later hyperlink cinema. Pratidwandi helped pioneer photo-negative flashback and X-ray digression techniques. Together with Madhabi Mukherjee, Ray was the first Indian film figure to be featured on a foreign stamp (Dominica).

Iranian filmmaker Majid Majidi has expressed deep admiration for Ray. While discussing the inspiration for his first feature film on India, Beyond the Clouds (2017), Majidi said, "I have learned a lot about India based on the works of remarkable Indian director Satyajit Ray so it was my dream to make a film in his land. His view point is very valuable to me and I love whatever he has done, so one of the main reasons behind making this film is my admiration for Satyajit Ray and his work". Wes Anderson said that his 2007 film, The Darjeeling Limited, is dedicated to Ray.

Many literary works include references to Ray or his work, including Saul Bellow's Herzog and J. M. Coetzee's Youth. Salman Rushdie's Haroun and the Sea of Stories contains fish characters named Goopy and Bagha, a tribute to Ray's fantasy film. In 1993, University of California, Santa Cruz established the Satyajit Ray Film and Study collection, and in 1995, the Government of India set up Satyajit Ray Film and Television Institute for studies related to film. In 2007, the BBC declared that two Feluda stories would be made into radio programs. During the London Film Festival, a regular "Satyajit Ray Award" is given to a first-time feature director whose film best captures "the artistry, compassion and humanity of Ray's vision".

A number of Documentary films have been produced about Ray in India, prominent ones include: Creative Artists of India - Satyajit Ray (1964) by Bhagwan Das Garga and Satyajit Ray (1982) by Shyam Benegal - both backed by the Government of India's Films Division, The Music of Satyajit Ray (1984) by Utpalendu Chakrabarty with funding from the National Film Development Corporation of India, Ray: Life and Work of Satyajit Ray (1999) by Goutam Ghose. In 2016, during the shooting of the film Double Feluda, Satyajit's son, Sandip, filmed his father's famous library.

On 23 February 2021 on the year of Satyajit Ray's birth centenary, the Union Information and Broadcasting Minister Prakash Javadekar announced that the central government would institute an award in the name of Satyajit Ray. The award is to be on a par with the Dadasaheb Phalke Award.

Preservation
The Academy Film Archive has preserved many of Ray's films: Abhijan in 2001, Aparajito in 1996, Apur Sansar in 1996, Charulata in 1996, Devi in 1996, Goopy Gyne Bagha Byne in 2003, Jalsaghar in 1996, Jana Aranya in 1996, Joi Baba Felunath in 2007, Kapurush in 2005, Mahanagar in 1996, Mahapurush in 2005, Nayak in 2004, Parash Pathar in 2007, Pather Panchali in 1996, Seemabaddha in 2001, Shatranj ke Khilari in 2010, Sikkim in 2007, Teen Kanya in 1996, and the short film Two in 2006. The Academy Film Archive additionally holds prints of other Ray films as part of its Satyajit Ray Collection.

International Film Festival of India
Birth centenary celebrations
In 52nd International Film Festival of India, on the occasion of his birth centenary, the Directorate of Film Festivals will pay tribute to him through a 'Special Retrospective'. 
 Award in recognition of legacy
In recognition of the auteur’s legacy, Lifetime Achievement Award was named as ‘Satyajit Ray Lifetime Achievement Award’ from 2021, to be given at the festival.

Awards, honours, and recognition

Ray received many awards, including 36 National Film Awards by the Government of India, and awards at international film festivals. At the 11th Moscow International Film Festival in 1979, he was awarded with the Honorable Prize for the contribution to cinema. At the Berlin International Film Festival, he was one of only four filmmakers to win the Silver Bear for Best Director more than once and holds the record for the most Golden Bear nominations, with seven. At the Venice Film Festival, where he had previously won a Golden Lion for Aparajito (1956), he was awarded the Golden Lion Honorary Award in 1982. That same year, he received an honorary "Hommage à Satyajit Ray" award at the 1982 Cannes Film Festival. Ray is the second film personality after Charlie Chaplin to have been awarded an honorary doctorate by Oxford University.

He was awarded the Dadasaheb Phalke Award in 1985, and the Legion of Honor by the President of France in 1987. The Government of India awarded him the Padma Bhushan in 1965 and the highest civilian honour, Bharat Ratna, shortly before his death. The Academy of Motion Picture Arts and Sciences awarded Ray an Honorary Award in 1992 for Lifetime Achievement. In 1992, he was posthumously awarded the Akira Kurosawa Award for Lifetime Achievement in Directing at the San Francisco International Film Festival; it was accepted on his behalf by actress Sharmila Tagore.

Participants in a 2004 BBC poll placed him No. 13 on the "Greatest Bengali of all time". In 1992, the Sight & Sound Critics' Top Ten Poll ranked Ray at No. 7 in its list of "Top 10 Directors" of all time, making him the highest-ranking Asian filmmaker in the poll. In 2002, the Sight & Sound critics' and directors' poll ranked Ray at No. 22 in its list of all-time greatest directors, thus making him the fourth highest-ranking Asian filmmaker in the poll. In 1996, Entertainment Weekly ranked Ray at No. 25 in its "50 Greatest Directors" list. In 2007, Total Film magazine included Ray in its "100 Greatest Film Directors Ever" list. In 2022, the Sydney Film Festival showcased 10 films by Ray as homage and the BFI Southbank screened a complete retrospective in July.

Ray family

Filmography

See also
 Culture of Bengal
 Culture of West Bengal
 List of Bengali-language authors (chronological)
 Literary works of Satyajit Ray
 Parallel cinema
 List of Indian writers

References

Bibliography

External links

  
 Satyajit Ray Film and Study Center – University of California Santa Cruz
 
 

Satyajit Ray
1921 births
1992 deaths
20th-century Indian composers
Academy Honorary Award recipients
Akira Kurosawa Award winners
Bengali detective fiction writers
Bengali film directors
Bengali writers
Bengali musicians
Bengali-language science fiction writers
Bengali-language writers
Best Director National Film Award winners
Best Music Direction National Film Award winners
Bengali Hindus
Brahmos
Commandeurs of the Ordre des Arts et des Lettres
Dadasaheb Phalke Award recipients
Indian mystery writers
Indian children's book illustrators
Indian children's writers
Indian male songwriters
Indian male screenwriters
Indian film score composers
Indian illustrators
Culture of Kolkata
Recipients of the Legion of Honour
People associated with Santiniketan
Film directors from Kolkata
Presidency University, Kolkata alumni
Ramon Magsaysay Award winners
Recipients of the Ananda Purashkar
Recipients of the Bharat Ratna
Recipients of the Padma Bhushan in arts
Recipients of the Padma Shri in arts
Recipients of the Padma Vibhushan in arts
Recipients of the Sangeet Natak Akademi Award
Recipients of the Sangeet Natak Akademi Fellowship
Silver Bear for Best Director recipients
Directors of Golden Bear winners
Directors of Golden Lion winners
University of Calcutta alumni
Visva-Bharati University alumni
Writers who illustrated their own writing
Indian Academy Award winners
20th-century Indian film directors
20th-century Indian dramatists and playwrights
Screenwriters from Kolkata
Musicians from Kolkata
Best Original Screenplay National Film Award winners
Special Jury Award (feature film) National Film Award winners
Directors who won the Best Feature Film National Film Award
Directors who won the Best Children's Film National Film Award
Filmfare Awards winners
Indian male film score composers
Indian science fiction writers
20th-century Indian screenwriters
20th-century male musicians